Kevin Michael Godley (born 7 October 1945) is an English singer, songwriter, musician and music video director. He is known as the singer and drummer of the art rock band 10cc and later as part of collaboration duo Godley & Creme with Lol Creme.

Biography

Kevin Michael Godley was born on 7 October 1945 in Prestwich, Lancashire, England, to a Jewish family, and went to North Cestrian Grammar School in Altrincham. He formed first band named Group 17, which had its origins in the Jewish Lads' Brigade. 

While attending art college in Manchester Godley met future creative partner Lol Creme. Godley and Creme joined the R&B combo The Sabres. They became involved in a number of bands such as The Mockingbirds, Hotlegs and later 10cc. As part of the bands Godley was a songwriter, lead singer, played drums, percussion and keyboards. Godley and Creme recorded four albums with 10cc. In 1977, early in the recording of the album Deceptive Bends, unimpressed with the songs by bandmates Eric Stewart and Graham Gouldman and eager to work on other projects outside of the band, Godley and Creme left.

After leaving 10cc the two became known as Godley & Creme, both as musicians and film directors. They were jointly nominated for a Grammy Award for 'Best Music Video, Long Form', for The Police: Synchronicity Concert in 1986. The duo split in 1988 after their album Goodbye Blue Sky. 

In 1990, Godley's charity production One World One Voice was released on CD in the UK. It was a CD that focused on environmental and ecological crises.

Both Godley and Creme briefly 'reunited' with their former 10cc bandmates Stewart and Gouldman on the 1992 album ...Meanwhile. However, Godley claims that their involvement with the project was very limited, as the album was dominated by studio musicians. He performed the lead vocal on "The Stars Didn't Show", the band's tribute to the late Roy Orbison. It was the only song on the album not sung by Stewart. Following ...Meanwhile, Godley and Creme went their separate ways again, having experienced difficulties together as early as 1988.

Godley later again reunited with Gouldman to form the band GG/06. Together they recorded a self-titled EP, which was made available for free via their website. Since then Godley has several times joined Gouldman's iteration of 10cc in concert, and was featured on the live album Clever Clogs.

More recently Godley moved into developing a music platform for the iPad, one that combines audio and video to create a global recording studio in the cloud called "WholeWorldBand". The company was nominated for the "SXSW Music Accelerator Award" in 2013, and was one of eight finalists selected from a pool of over 500. 

In 2017, Godley publicly invited musicians to send him music to work on his first solo album, titled Muscle Memory with the idea being that he would take the rough ideas and turn them into a finished song. The album was originally supposed to be released in 2018 through campaign on pledgemusic.com, but due to its closure the release was postponed. In 2021, Kevin Godley's album Muscle Memory was completed and released by The state51 Conspiracy after the project stalled as a PledgeMusic campaign.

In 2018, Godley was awarded an honorary Doctorate of Arts by Staffordshire University. 

He currently lives in Dublin, Ireland, and hopes to direct a film based on Orson Welles' time in Ireland.

Discography
Studio albums
 Muscle Memory (2020)

As featured artist
 "The Bad & the Beautiful" - Hog Fever (2016)
 "Confessions" - Hog Fever (2016)
 "Expecting a Message" - Before During After: The Story of 10cc (2017)

Music videos director
After splitting from his long-time working partner Creme, Godley forged a career directing music videos and films on his own.

1989
 Fine Young Cannibals – "Don't Look Back"
 Band Aid 2 – "Do They Know It's Christmas?"
 Wet Wet Wet – "Sweet Surrender"

1990
 Erasure – "Blue Savannah"
 One World One Voice – short movie

1991
 Bryan Adams – "Can't Stop This Thing We Started"
 Bryan Adams – "Thought I'd Died and Gone to Heaven"
 Bryan Adams – "All I Want Is You"
 U2 – "Even Better Than the Real Thing"

1992
 Garland Jeffreys – "The Answer"
 Moodswings & Chrissie Hynde – "Spiritual High"
 U2 – Zoo TV Concert Video

1993
 Frank Sinatra & Bono – "I've Got You Under My Skin"
 Paul McCartney – "C'Mon People"
 Sting – "Fields of Gold"
 U2 – "Numb"

1994
 Blur – "Girls & Boys"
 Bono & Gavin Friday – "In the Name of the Father"
 Dave Stewart – "Heart of Stone"
 East 17 – "Steam"
 Larry Adler & Kate Bush – "The Man I Love"

1995
 Deep Forest – "Deep Forest"
 U2 – "Hold Me, Thrill Me, Kiss Me, Kill Me"
 Whale – "I'll Do Ya"

1996
 Adam Clayton & Larry Mullen Jr. – "Theme from Mission: Impossible"
 Bryan Adams – "Star"
 Gavin Friday – "You, Me and World War Three"
 Phil Collins – "Dance into the Light"
 The Beatles – "Real Love"
 Tonic – "Soldier's Daughter"

1997
 Forest for the Trees – "Dream"
 Garland Jeffreys – "Sexuality"
 James – "Tomorrow"
 Jean-Michel Jarre – "Oxygène Part 8"

1998
 Boyzone – "When the Going Gets Tough"
 Boyzone – "You Needed Me"
 Eric Clapton – "My Father's Eyes"
 Helicopter Girl – "Subliminal Punk"
 Kele Le Roc – "My Love"
 Phil Collins – "You'll Be in My Heart"
 Sting – "After the Rain Has Fallen"
 The Black Crowes – "By Your Side"
 The Charlatans – "Forever"
 U2 – "Sweetest Thing"

1999
 Ronan Keating – "When You Say Nothing at All"
 Wyclef Jean featuring Bono – "New Day"

2000
 Alabama 3 – "Woke Up This Morning"
 Gabrielle – "Rise"
 Rod Stewart – "Run Back into Your Arms"

2001
 Gabrielle – "Out of Reach"
 HIM – "Pretending"
 Marti Pellow – "Close To You"
 U2 – "Stuck in a Moment You Can't Get Out Of" (version 2)
 Zucchero – "Baila"
 Zucchero – "I'm in Trouble"

2002
 Ronan Keating – "If Tomorrow Never Comes"
 Ronan Keating – "We've Got Tonight"
 Scarface featuring Faith Evans – "Someday"
 The Charlatans – "A Man Needs to Be Told"

2003
 The Rapture – "Sister Saviour"
 Will Young – "Leave Right Now"

2004
 Bryan Adams – "Flying"
 Haven – "Wouldn't Change a Thing"
 Kealer – "Cry"
 Lisa Stansfield – "Treat Me Like a Woman"
 Ronan Keating – "Father and Son"
 The Corrs – "Summer Sunshine"

2005
 Ben Adams – "Sorry"
 Katie Melua – "Nine Million Bicycles"
 Katie Melua – "I Cried for You"
 Jamie Cullum – "Mind Trick"
 Shayne Ward – "That's My Goal"

2006
 Brothermandude – "Automatic"
 Keane – "Is It Any Wonder?"
 Mojo Fury – "The Man"

2008
 Boyzone – "Better"
 Snow Patrol – "Crack the Shutters"

2010
 Katie Melua – "The Flood"

2011
 Gavin Friday – "Able"

2016
 Elbow – "Gentle Storm"

2018
 Hozier - "Better Love"

2019
 Keane - "The Way I Feel"

References

External links
 
 
 

1945 births
English baritones
English drummers
British male drummers
English film directors
English Jews
English music video directors
English songwriters
Ivor Novello Award winners
Jewish English musicians
Jewish rock musicians
Living people
People educated at North Cestrian Grammar School
People from Prestwich
British percussionists
10cc members